Carlisle is a constituency in Cumbria represented in the House of Commons of the UK Parliament since 2010 by John Stevenson of the Conservative Party.

History
Carlisle has existed as a seat since the Model Parliament in 1295. It was represented by Labour Party MPs from 1964 to 2010, although the Conservative candidate came within 2% of taking the seat in 1983–1987, and has been held by John Stevenson of the Conservative Party since the 2010 general election.

Boundaries

1918–1955: The County Borough of Carlisle.

1955–1983: As 1918 but with redrawn boundaries.

1983–1997: The City of Carlisle wards of Belah, Belle Vue, Botcherby, Currock, Denton Holme, Harraby, Morton, St Aidan's, Stanwix Urban, Trinity, Upperby, and Yewdale.

1997–2010: The City of Carlisle wards of Belah, Belle Vue, Botcherby, Burgh, Currock, Dalston, Denton Holme, Harraby, Morton, St Aidan's, St Cuthbert Without, Stanwix Urban, Trinity, Upperby, and Yewdale.

2010–present: The City of Carlisle wards of Belah, Belle Vue, Botcherby, Burgh, Castle, Currock, Dalston, Denton Holme, Harraby, Morton, St Aidan's, Stanwix Urban, Upperby, Wetheral, and Yewdale.

Constituency
The constituency covers the city of Carlisle itself. It also covers the rural area of the district to the south and west of the city, including the village of Dalston. The remaining parts of the district are in the Penrith and The Border constituency. Historically the constituency was tightly drawn around the city which favour the Labour Party but has gradually expanded to contain more rural areas within the district that are far more Conservative-inclined, such as Burgh, Dalston and Wetheral. This has seen the constituency shift from being a safe Labour seat to marginal status.

Members of Parliament

MPs 1295–1640

Long Parliament
 1640–1644: Sir William Dalston, Bt (Royalist) – disabled to sit, January 1644
 1640–1648 : Richard Barwis (Parliamentarian) – died April 1648
 1645(?)–1648(?): Thomas Cholmley – not recorded as having sat after Pride's Purge, December 1648
 1649: Edward Howard, 1st Baron Howard of Escrick, from House of Lords
 1653: Carlisle was unrepresented in the Barebones Parliament.

First Protectorate Parliament (One member only)
 1654–1655: Colonel Thomas Fitch

Second Protectorate Parliament (One member only)
 1656–1658: George Downing

Third Protectorate Parliament
 1659: George Downing
 1659: Thomas Craister

Long Parliament (restored)
 1659–1660: Thomas Cholmley
 1659–1660: Edward Howard, 1st Baron Howard of Escrick

MPs 1660–1885

MPs since 1885

Election results

Elections in the 2010s

This was the largest UKIP vote share at the 2019 general election.

Elections in the 2000s

Elections in the 1990s

Elections in the 1980s

Elections in the 1970s

Elections in the 1960s

Elections in the 1950s

Election in the 1940s

Elections in the 1930s
General election 1939–40:
Another general election was required to take place before the end of 1940. The political parties had been making preparations for an election to take place and by the Autumn of 1939, the following candidates had been selected;
 Conservative: Edward Spears
 Labour: Percy Barstow
 Liberal: Leslie H. Storey

Elections in the 1920s

Elections in the 1910s

A General Election was due to take place by the end of 1915. By the summer of 1914, the following candidates had been adopted to contest that election. Due to the outbreak of war, the election never took place.
British Socialist Party: Ernest Lowthian

Elections in the 1900s

Elections in the 1890s

Elections in the 1880s

Elections in the 1870s

Elections in the 1860s

 

 

 
 

 

 
 
 

 Caused by Graham's death.

Elections in the 1850s

 
 
 
 

 
 
 

 

 

 

 Caused by Graham's appointment as First Lord of the Admiralty

Elections in the 1840s

 

   
 
 

 

 

 Caused by the previous election being declared void on petition due to the "several acts of treating".

Elections in the 1830s

Elections in the 18th century
Election results taken from the History of Parliament Trust series.

 Death of Hylton

 Note: Stanwix was unseated on petition and replaced by Hylton, 26 January 1742

 Stanwix appointed Governor of Kingston-upon-Hull

See also

 List of parliamentary constituencies in Cumbria

Notes

References

External links
 nomis Constituency Profile for Carlisle – presenting data from the ONS annual population survey and other official statistics.

Parliamentary constituencies in North West England
Politics of Carlisle, Cumbria
Constituencies of the Parliament of the United Kingdom established in 1295